The Clare Valley wine region is one of Australia's oldest wine regions, best known for Riesling wines. It lies in the Mid North of South Australia, approximately 142 km north of Adelaide. The valley runs north-south, with Horrocks Highway as the main thoroughfare.

Extent and appellation
Clare Valley wine region covers an area adjoining the both sides of the Horrocks Highway as it passes through the town of Clare near its northern extent and the town of Auburn near its southern extent. The Clare Valley wine region was registered as an Australian Geographical Indication on 25 March 1999.

Soil and climate

The climate is moderately continental, with cool to cold nights and warm to hot summer days. The higher altitude, compared to other wine regions in South Australia, ensures cool nights even during the heat of summer allowing the fruit to ripen more evenly and slowly. Rainfall is predominantly in winter – spring (June – September) with an annual average of around 630 mm. Summers are dry and make irrigation desirable but also ensure a minimum of fungal diseases. Varied soil types throughout the valleys are another feature, ranging from red to brown grey over basement rock.

Grape varieties

The most important white variety is Riesling, with the Clare Valley regarded as its Australian home.  Principal red varieties are Cabernet Sauvignon and Shiraz. They make a range of styles of varietal wines, reflecting different approaches to winemaking as well as the influences of the various sub-regions and micro-climates in the valleys. Many other lesser varieties are also grown, including Chardonnay, Semillion, Sauvignon Blanc, Pinot Noir, Tempranillo and Grenache.   The Clare Valley Region contributes around 2% of the Australian national grape crush, but wins over 7% of all medals awarded for Australian wine.

Regional facts
The region has more than 48 wineries, most of which are small and produce only bottled wine.
Area planted: 
Annual production: 2014: 

The Clare Valley Wine Region does not have any legally-defined subregions. It is sometimes informally divided into five subregions named for the towns in those growing areas: Auburn, Clare, Polish Hill River, Sevenhill and Watervale.

Population
Town Populations:

As a rural region, there are also population pockets outside of the town centres (not shown here).

See also

Australian wine
South Australian wine
List of wineries in the Clare Valley

Citations and references

Citations

References

External links 
http://clarevalleywine.com.au } Clare Valley Wine & Grape Association
http://www.claremuseum.com/1-early-wine-making | Clare Museum of the National Trust
http://www.clarevalley.com.au/drink | Clare Valley Tourism - Cellar Doors

 

Wine regions of South Australia
Mid North (South Australia)